Diopisthoporus is a genus of acoels. It is the only genus in the monotypic family Diopisthoporidae

Species
There are five species recognised in the genus Diopisthoporus.

References

Acoelomorphs
Monogeneric animal families